Davinciite is a very rare mineral of the eudialyte group, with the simplified formula Na12K3Ca6Fe32+Zr3(Si26O73OH)Cl2. The formula given does not show the presence of cyclic silicate groups. The mineral was named after Leonardo da Vinci to refer to the atypical geometrical forms he tended to use, compared by the authors of the mineral description to the atypical (not ideally centrosymmetrical) geometry of the Davinciite structure. The other quite atypical feature of Davinciite is its lavender colour, while the typical eudialyte is rather pink or red.

Occurrence and association
Davinciite was discovered in hyperagpaitic (highly alkaline) pegmatite at Mt. Rasvmuchorr, Khibiny massif, Kola Peninsula, Russia. Aegirine, delhayelite, nepheline, potassium feldspar, shcherbakovite, sodalite (silicates), djerfisherite, rasvumite (sulfides), nitrite, nacaphite, and villiaumite are associated minerals.

Notes on chemistry
Impurities in davinciite include strontium, manganese, titanium, with minor aluminium, barium, hafnium, and niobium. Some water is also present.

See also
List of minerals
List of minerals named after people

References

Cyclosilicates
Sodium minerals
Potassium minerals
Calcium minerals
Iron(II) minerals
Zirconium minerals
Trigonal minerals
Minerals in space group 160